Lemuel is a Hebrew name, meaning "devoted to God", which may refer to:

In religion
 Lemuel (biblical king), mentioned in the Book of Proverbs, Chapter 31
 Lemuel (Book of Mormon), the second eldest of Lehi's sons and the brother of Laman, Sam, Nephi, Jacob and Joseph

People
 Lemuel Francis Abbott (c. 1760 – 1802), English portrait painter
 Lemuel Amerman (1846–1897), member of the U.S. House of Representatives from Pennsylvania
 Lemuel H. Arnold (1792–1852), 12th Governor of Rhode Island and United States congressman
 Lemuel Benton (1754–1818), American planter and politician, member of the U.S. House of Representatives from South Carolina
 Lemuel J. Bowden (1815–1864), American lawyer, politician and U.S. senator from Virginia 
 Lemuel Carpenter (c. 1808 – 1859), one of the first African-American settlers in what is now the Los Angeles area, entrepreneur and rancher
 Lemuel Chenoweth (1811–1887), American carpenter, legislator and self-educated architect
 Lemuel Cushing, Jr. (1842–1881), Canadian lawyer and politician
 Lemuel Grant (1817–1893), American engineer, businessman, land speculator and civic leader
 Lemuel Haynes (1753–1833), African American religious leader and slavery opponent
 Lemuel Jenkins (1789–1862), American lawyer and member of the U.S. House of Representatives from New York
 Lemuel McPherson Christian (1913–2000), Dominican composer
 Lemuel Mathewson (1899–1970), U.S. Army lieutenant general
 Lemuel Owen (1822–1912), shipbuilder, banker, merchant, politician and the second Premier of Prince Edward Island, Canada
 Lemuel P. Padgett (1855–1922), member of the U.S. House of Representatives from Tennessee
 Lemuel Paynter (1788–1863), member of the U.S. House of Representatives from Pennsylvania
 Lemuel Penn (1915–1964), African-American lieutenant colonel murdered by members of the Ku Klux Klan
 Lemuel E. Prowse (1858–1925), merchant and politician in Prince Edward Island, Canada
 Lemuel E. Quigg (1863–1919), U.S. Representative from New York
 Lemuel Sawyer (1777–1852), Congressional Representative from North Carolina
 Lemuel Shaw (1781–1861), Chief Justice of the Massachusetts Supreme Court, member of the Massachusetts House of Representatives and state senator
 Lemuel C. Shepherd, Jr. (1896–1990), United States Marine Corps four-star general and 20th Commandant of the Marine Corps
 Lemuel Smith (born 1941), serial killer
 Lemuel Smith (cricketer) (1880–1927), English cricketer
 Lemuel F. Smith (1890–1956), Virginia lawyer and judge
 Lemuel Stetson (1804–1868), U.S. Representative from New York
 Lemuel Stinson (born 1966), former National Football League cornerback
 Lemuel Todd (1817–1891), member of the U.S. House of Representatives from Pennsylvania
 Lemuel John Tweedie (1849–1917), Canadian politician and 10th Premier of New Brunswick
 Lemuel Whitman (1780–1841), U.S. Representative from Connecticut
 Lemuel M. Wiles (1826-1905), American landscape painter.
 Lemuel Williams (1747–1828), U.S. Representative from Massachusetts
 Lemuel Wilmarth (1835–1918), French painter and founded of Art Students League of New York
 Lemuel Allan Wilmot (1809–1878), Canadian lawyer, politician, and judge

Fictional characters
 Lemuel Gulliver, protagonist of Gulliver's Travels
 Lemuel "Lemmy" Barnet, in the BBC Radio science fiction programme Journey into Space
 Lemuel "Chipper" Barnet, in the BBC Radio science fiction programme Space Force
 Lemuel "Lemmy" Caution, special agent / private detective created by Peter Cheyney
 Lemuel Dorcas, a Marvel Comics character
 Lemuel Idzik, on the American television show Oz
 Lemuel (Camp Lazlo), in the American animated television series Camp Lazlo
 Lemuel, an antagonist in the American animated television series Fanboy & Chum Chum
 Lemuel Siddons, the Scout Master in the movie Follow Me, Boys!